Walkie Talkie is a Taiwanese female duo musical group.

Discography
 June 25, 1998 《情比姐妹深》 (Deeper relationship than sisters)
 01 星期天不要見面 (Don't want to meet on Sundays)
 02 情比姐妹深 (No deeper relationship than between sisters)
 03 未了  (Outstanding)
 04 大峽谷 (Grand Canyon)
 05 给我爱情 (Give Me love)
 06 一同去郊遊 (Together to the Countryside)
 07 單飛 (Solo)
 08 愛失去了也好 (Love or Lost)
 09 不確定 (Unsure)
 10 錦繡前程 (Beautiful Future)
 March 26, 1999 《我的SUPER LIFE》 (My Super Life)
 01 我的super life (My Super Life)
 02 交換日記 (Swapping diaries)
 03 明天也要作伴 (Friends Tomorrow)
 04 才愛到一半 (Half-Love)
 05 自由活動 (Free Movement)
 06 快點!!快點!! (Come!! Come!!)
 07 牽牛花 (Morning glory)
 08 幸福 (Gokkun)
 09 你愛我 (You Love Me)
 10 灰色的雲 (Gray clouds)
 March 7, 2000 《錦繡三溫暖》(The Grandeur of the three warms)
 01 愛情得零分 曲：Shermann 詞：Shermann (Love in the zero song: Shermann words: Shermann)
 02 還是一個人 曲：Shermann 詞：林文炫 (Or a song: Shermann words: LIN-hyun)
 03 講真話 曲：薛忠銘 詞：姚若龍 (Qu speak the truth: XUE Zhong-Ming words: Long Yaoruo)
 04 HELLO 五彩汽球 曲：李正帆 詞：顏璽轩 (HELLO multicolored balloons song: Li Zhengfan words: Yuxi Xuan Yen)
 05 沒有你沒有感覺 曲：於秀琴 詞：於秀琴 (No you do not have the feeling of song: the Xiuqin words: in Xiuqin)
 06 最美的一天 曲：戚小戀 詞：厲曼婷 (The most beautiful song of the day: Qi small Love words: Li Man-ting)
 07 姐妹淘 曲：陳建寧/陳政卿 詞：鄭淑妃 (Jie Meitao song: Chen Jianning / Chen Zhenggao Big Words: Zheng Shufei)
 08 河堤 曲：黄中原 詞：謝銘佑 (Riverbank song: Huang Zhongyuan words: Xie Ming-yu)
 09 粉筆字 曲：boxx 徐繼宗 詞：boxx 徐繼宗 (Fenbi Zi Qu: boxx Xu Jizong words: box Xu Jizong)
 10 一直走一直走 曲：游鴻明 詞：姚若龍 (Has Been Walking Has Been Walking song: Yu, Hung Ming words: Long Yaoruo)
 11 可惜他不懂 曲：黃錦雯 詞：陳靜楠 (Unfortunately, he do not know song: Huang Jinwen words: Chen Jing-nan)
 12 月光 曲：周傑倫 詞：林怡芬 (Moonlight song: Jay words: Lin Yifen)
 November 14, 2000 錦鏽羅曼史I-美麗與哀愁 (Fairview romance |- is beautiful and is sorrowful)
 01 天涼好個秋  (Day cool good fall)
 02 一串心  (A string of good days)
 03 你那好冷的小手  (You that good cold microcheiria)
 04 深秋 (Late autumn)
 05 金盏花 (Marigold)
 06 秋詩篇篇 (Qiushipianpian)
 07 卻上心頭 (But on my heart)
 08 美麗與哀愁 (Peony Pavilion)
 09 風兒踢踏踩 (Wind step on tap)
 10 聚散兩依依  (Jusan two Yiyi)
 11 看到楓林小雨 (Fenglin see light rain)
 12 雁兒在林稍  (Lin Yan Er slightly)
 13 神話  (Myth)
 14 冬天里的一把火  (Winter fire)
 August 8, 2001 錦繡羅曼史II-夏之旅 (Beautiful Frotteurism II-summer trip)
 01 夏之旅 (Summer Tour)
 02 飛向你飛向我 (I fly towards you)
 03 海裡來的沙 (Nautical miles to the sand)
 04 思念總在分手後  (After the miss in breaking up)
 05 外婆的澎湖灣 (Grandmother's Penghu Bay)
 06 珊瑚戀 (Coral Love)
 07 碧城故事 (Bi-Story City)
 08 走在陽光里 (Walk in the Sun)
 09 愛神 (Spirit of Love)
 10小城故事 (Stories of the Little City)
 11何年何月再相逢 (Ho, Ho, then meet)
 12月朦朧鳥朦朧 (On hazy bird dim)
 13早安台北 (Good Morning Taipei)
 14我家在那裡 (Where's my home)
 May 7, 2007 二十年後的幸福：收录28首歌，其中有24首經典歌曲，另有4首新歌：愛到夏天、20年後的幸福、學會離開、一開始相戀 (After 20 years of happiness: recorded 28 songs, of which 24 classic songs, and four new songs: love the summer, after 20 years of happiness and learn to leave, at the beginning love)

External links
 PixNet

Mandopop musical groups
Taiwanese girl groups
Pop music duos
Female musical duos
Taiwanese musical duos